Michel Olçomendy, M.E.P. (29 August 1901 – 4 July 1977) was the first Archbishop of Singapore, installed on 18 December 1972 until his retirement in 1976. Previously, he served as the Bishop of Malacca and Singapore.

Biography

Early years 
Born in Saint-Étienne-de-Baïgorry, France, he ordained as a priest on 29 May 1926 at the age of 24, and became a clergyman of the La Société des Missions Etrangères.

Bishop of Malacca 

On 21 January 1947, Olçomendy was officially installed as Bishop of Malacca and Singapore at the Cathedral of the Good Shepherd, serving in the position until he was appointed Archbishop of Malacca on 19 September 1953, at the age of 52.

Archbishop of Malacca-Singapore 

He took office as Metropolitan Archbishop of Malacca-Singapore on 25 February 1955, and as President of Catholic Bishops’ Conference of Malaysia, Singapore and Brunei in 1964. Olçomendy remained as President until 1969.

Olçomendy took on the new office as the Archbishop of Singapore on 18 December 1972, until retiring in 1976. Olçomendy died a year later on 4 July 1977.

External links
 Archdiocese of Singapore
 Archbishops of Singapore at GCatholic.org
 Historical profile at catholic.sg
 Historical profile at National Library Board of Singapore
 Interventions at Vatican 2 Council for Ad Gentes

1901 births
1977 deaths
Participants in the Second Vatican Council
20th-century Roman Catholic archbishops in Singapore
Paris Foreign Missions Society bishops
Roman Catholic archbishops of Singapore